Cover Story is a Hindi thriller film directed by Laurence Postma starring Anjum Nayar and Jackie Shroff. It is the second official remake of the acclaimed Dutch film Interview, directed by Theo Van Gogh in 2003, the first being Interview by Steve Buscemi in 2007.

Plot
Cover Story is based on the story of a successful Film actress (Anjum) and a special assignment for a magazine COVER STORY, a one night account of an interview with the film star and the scoop that the correspondent gets for the publication.

Cast
Anjum Nayar
Jackie Shroff
Yuri Suri

Soundtrack

References

External links 
 

Indian remakes of foreign films
2010s Hindi-language films
2011 thriller films
2011 films
Films scored by Shamir Tandon
Indian thriller films
Hindi-language thriller films